TickX is a SAAS company based in Manchester, England, which aims to help companies sell more tickets directly through their own websites. It was founded in 2015 as an events and tickets search engine, comparing events in the UK, Ireland, Spain and Netherlands.

While studying at the University of Manchester, co-founder Steve Pearce wanted to create a single destination for event goers to discover events. Pearce pitched the idea to family friend and future co-founder Sam Coley, a software developer.

In 2015, TickX received backing from Ministry of Sound, with Pearce and Coley earning nominations as one of Virgin's "Four young entrepreneurs to watch in 2016".  In the second half of 2017, TickX expanded to the Republic of Ireland and Spain.

In July 2017, TickX unveiled an event Chatbot via Facebook Messenger.

In September 2018, TickX launched Producer360, a toolkit to give producers access to their customer journey and analytics technology.

In April 2021, TickX refocussed to become a pure SaaS company and switched off the events and tickets search engine at TickX.com.

References 

Comparison shopping websites